Attila Buday (born June 28, 1974) is a Hungarian-born Canadian sprint canoer who competed from 1996 to 2006. He won three silver medals at the ICF Canoe Sprint World Championships (C-2 1000 m: 2006, C-4 1000 m: 2002, 2003)

Competing in three Summer Olympics, Buday earned his best finish of seventh in the C-2 1000 m event at Sydney in 2000.

Buday's father Tamás won bronze medals in the C-2 500 m and C-2 1000 m events at the 1976 Summer Olympics in Montreal.

Buday resides in Mississauga with his wife Carrie Buday.

References

 

1974 births
Living people
Canadian male canoeists
Canoeists at the 1996 Summer Olympics
Canoeists at the 2000 Summer Olympics
Canoeists at the 2004 Summer Olympics
Canadian people of Hungarian descent
Hungarian emigrants to Canada
Naturalized citizens of Canada
Olympic canoeists of Canada
Canoeists from Budapest
ICF Canoe Sprint World Championships medalists in Canadian
Pan American Games medalists in canoeing
Pan American Games silver medalists for Canada
Canoeists at the 1995 Pan American Games
Medalists at the 1995 Pan American Games